Hans-Jürgen Thies (born 11 August 1955) is a German lawyer and politician of the Christian Democratic Union (CDU) who has been serving as a member of the Bundestag from the state of North Rhine-Westphalia since 2017.

Political career 
Thies became member of the Bundestag in the 2017 German federal election. He is a member of the Committee on Legal Affairs and Consumer Protection and the Committee on Food and Agriculture.

Other activities 
 German Bar Association (DAV), Member

References

External links 

  
 Bundestag biography 

1955 births
Living people
Members of the Bundestag for North Rhine-Westphalia
Members of the Bundestag 2017–2021
Members of the Bundestag 2021–2025
Members of the Bundestag for the Christian Democratic Union of Germany